Roosevelt State Park is a public recreation area located off Interstate 20 on the southwest side of Morton, Mississippi. The state park surrounds  Shadow Lake at the western edge of Bienville National Forest, between Jackson and Meridian. It is managed by the Mississippi Department of Wildlife, Fisheries and Parks.

History
The park was one of the original Mississippi state parks built by the Civilian Conservation Corps in the 1930s. The CCC began work August 1935; the park opened in April 1940.

Activities and amenities
The park features boating, waterskiing and fishing, primitive and developed campsites, cabins, motel, and group camping in dormitory-style cabins. Other features include 4.8 miles of nature trails, a scenic overlook with views of Bienville National Forest, tennis courts, softball field, picnic areas and pavilions, playground equipment, visitors center, 18-hole disc golf course, and swimming pool. The 600-seat Livingston Performing Arts & Media Center is also located in the park.

References

External links
Roosevelt State Park Mississippi Department of Wildlife, Fisheries, and Parks

State parks of Mississippi
Protected areas of Scott County, Mississippi
Historic districts on the National Register of Historic Places in Mississippi
National Register of Historic Places in Scott County, Mississippi
Parks on the National Register of Historic Places in Mississippi